Brandon Umba (born September 8, 1985) is an American Republican Party politician who has represented the 8th Legislative district in the New Jersey General Assembly since he took office on January 11, 2022.

A resident of Medford, where he has served on the Zoning Board of Adjustment, Umba has served as the Township Administrator of West Deptford Township, Lumberton and Manchester Township.

District 8
Each of the 40 districts in the New Jersey Legislature has one representative in the New Jersey Senate and two members in the New Jersey General Assembly. The other representatives from the 8th District for the 2022—2023 Legislative Session are:
Senator Jean Stanfield (R)
Assemblyman Michael Torrissi (R)

References

External links
Legislative webpage

Living people
1985 births
Catholic University of America alumni
Politicians from Burlington County, New Jersey
Republican Party members of the New Jersey General Assembly
People from Medford, New Jersey